Hesperomeles ferruginea is an evergreen shrub or tree in the family Rosaceae, native to montane forests on the Andes from Venezuela to Bolivia.

Description 
Shrub or tree up to 12 m high and 50 cm dbh; with gray bark; branchlets rusty colored. Leaves are ovate or elliptic, with serrate margins, 5 – 7 cm long, covered with rusty colored hairs on the underside. The white flowers are arranged in a cymose inflorescence up to 10 cm long; the petals are white and pilose, ca. 1 cm long; the bittersweet red fruits resemble little apples, up to 2 cm wide.

Distribution and habitat 
Hesperomeles ferruginea is found in the Andes, from Venezuela to Bolivia, between 1900 and 4000 m of elevation. It is found in montane forests and paramo grasslands.

Uses 
Hesperomeles ferruginea yields good quality wood, suitable for indoors carpentry. It has white color, straight grain and medium texture.

References

Further reading 

Trees of Peru
Trees of Bolivia
Trees of Ecuador
Trees of Colombia
Trees of Venezuela
Maleae